Leopoldus Eduardus Theoduris "Leo" Peelen (16 July 1968 – 24 March 2017) was a Dutch track cyclist. He won the silver medal at the 1988 Summer Olympics in Seoul in the points race. The following year, he captured a bronze medal at the 1989 World Championships. Peelen became six times Dutch champion on the track (Pointsrace in 1983, 1984, 1985 (winter), Individual Pursuit 1986 and Madison 1987 and 1988).

He was the chairman of the organization of the yearly time trial and cycling festival in Beek. He was one of the 66 riders who participated in the first Alpe d'HuZes when he climbed the Alpe d'Huez six times on 6 June 2006. They fundraised €400,000 for the Dutch Cancer Society during that event.

On 24 March 2017, Peelen died unexpectedly at the age of 48.

See also
 List of Dutch Olympic cyclists

References

1968 births
2017 deaths
Dutch male cyclists
Cyclists at the 1988 Summer Olympics
Olympic cyclists of the Netherlands
Olympic silver medalists for the Netherlands
Sportspeople from Arnhem
Dutch track cyclists
Olympic medalists in cycling
Medalists at the 1988 Summer Olympics
Cyclists from Gelderland
20th-century Dutch people
21st-century Dutch people